Quoins are masonry blocks at the corner of a wall.

Quoin or Du Quoin may also refer to:

Places
 Quoin Bluff, Western Australia
 Quoin Hill Airfield, Vanuatu
 Du Quoin, Illinois, USA
 Du Quoin station
 Du Quoin State Fairgrounds
 DuQuoin State Fairgrounds Racetrack

Other
 Quoin (gunnery), a wedge used in aiming a cannon
 Quoin (printing), wooden or metal wedges or cam operated devices for locking printing type into a chase

See also
 Quoin Island (disambiguation)